There is more than one Carthage Senior High School:

Carthage Senior High School (Carthage, Missouri)
Carthage Senior High School (Carthage, New York)
Carthage High School (Carthage, Texas)
Carthage High School (Carthage, Illinois) - now deactivated and a component of the consolidated Illini West High School